Thomas Samuel Pratt (born June 21, 1935) is an American football coach in the National Football League (NFL). He played college football at the University of Miami and attended Beloit Memorial High School in Beloit, Wisconsin. He has been a coach in the American Football League and National Football League since 1963.

Early years
Pratt played high school football at Beloit Memorial High School. He earned all-state honors as a guard in 1952 while the team went undefeated.

College career
Pratt played offensive guard and linebacker for the Miami Hurricanes from 1953 to 1956, earning All-American honors at linebacker his senior year in 1956. He graduated from Miami with a degree in education in 1957. He was inducted into the University of Miami Sports Hall of Fame in 1991.

Coaching career
Pratt was an assistant coach for the Miami Hurricanes at the University of Miami from 1957 to 1960. He was the head freshman coach in 1957. He was then the coach of varsity guards and linebackers for the next three years. Pratt served as line coach for the Southern Miss Golden Eagles at the University of Southern Mississippi from 1961 to 1962. Pratt was the defensive line coach for the Kansas City Chiefs from 1963 to 1977, helping the team win the AFL championship in 1966 and 1969 while also winning Super Bowl IV. He served as defensive line coach of the New Orleans Saints from 1978 to 1980. He was defensive line coach of the Cleveland Browns from 1981 to 1988. Pratt served as defensive line coach of the Kansas City Chiefs from 1989 to 1994.  He was defensive line coach of the Tampa Bay Buccaneers in 1995.

Pratt served as defensive line coach of the Coast Guard Bears at the United States Coast Guard Academy in 1997. He served as a football ambassador in Osaka, Japan for the Asahi Challengers of the X-League from 1998 to 1999. He returned to help the Challengers win the Japan Super Bowl in 2000. He returned to the Chiefs as the assistant defensive line coach in 2000. Pratt became pass rush specialist for the Arizona Cardinals in 2013. He had previously spent three years as a defensive coordinator consultant with IMG Academy prior to joining the Cardinals.

Personal life
Pratt has also spent time as a consultant to Kyoto University.

References

External links
Professional coaching record
NFL Films Presents: Tom Pratt

Living people
1935 births
Players of American football from Wisconsin
American football linebackers
American football offensive guards
Miami Hurricanes football players
Miami Hurricanes football coaches
Southern Miss Golden Eagles football coaches
Kansas City Chiefs coaches
New Orleans Saints coaches
Cleveland Browns coaches
Tampa Bay Buccaneers coaches
Coast Guard Bears football coaches
Arizona Cardinals coaches
People from Edgerton, Wisconsin